Mars or Resting Mars (Descanso de Marte, literally The Rest of Mars) is a 1640 painting by Diego Velázquez. It is now in the Prado Museum. The painting was inspired by Il Pensieroso, one of Michelangelo's sculptures for the Medici in the new sacristy of the Basilica of San Lorenzo. This painting is a satirical depiction of the god Mars. It is thought to have been finished around 1639–1640.

External links
Velázquez , exhibition catalog from The Metropolitan Museum of Art (fully available online as PDF), which contains material on this painting (see index)

1640 paintings
Paintings by Diego Velázquez in the Museo del Prado
Mythological paintings by Diego Velázquez
Paintings of Mars (mythology)